Bettina Alexandra Hauert (born 18 June 1982) is a German professional golfer and member of the Ladies European Tour.

Amateur career
Born in Hagen, Germany, Hauert was the individual champion at the 2003 Sherry Cup. She was also a member of the 2003 European team at the Vagliano Trophy.

Professional career
Hauert won the Ladies European Tour qualifying school in 2003, and in 2004 become the first female golf professional to take a place alongside the men on the Playing Pro Team of the PGA of Germany. In her first three seasons on tour her best finish was a tie for seventh at the Scandinavian TPC hosted by Annika. She gained her first professional victory in a three-way playoff at the 2007 Deutsche Bank Ladies Swiss Open. and her second win at the Finnair Masters. After finishing 2nd at the Wales Ladies Championship of Europe, Hauert qualified for the 2007 Solheim Cup team. Following the 2007 season, she was voted the Ladies European Tour Player's Player of the Year, after finishing a close second to Sophie Gustafson in the Order of Merit.

Professional wins (2)

Ladies European Tour wins (2)
2007 (2) Deutsche Bank Ladies Swiss Open, Finnair Masters

Team appearances
Amateur
European Ladies' Team Championship (representing Germany): 2003
Professional
Solheim Cup (representing Europe): 2007
World Cup (representing Germany): 2008

Solheim Cup record

References

External links

German female golfers
Ladies European Tour golfers
Solheim Cup competitors for Europe
Sportspeople from Hagen
1982 births
Living people